Albert Roussos (born 22 February 1996) is a Greek professional footballer who plays as a defender.

Career
He made his Football League debut for Diagoras on 28 October 2011 in a game against Kallithea.

After a short spell at AERA Afantou, Roussos joined AO Pyliou at the end of January 2020.

Honours
Volos
Football League: 2018–19

References

External links
 

1996 births
People from Rhodes
Living people
Greek footballers
Greek expatriate footballers
Greece youth international footballers
Greece under-21 international footballers
Diagoras F.C. players
Juventus F.C. players
Cercle Brugge K.S.V. players
Panthrakikos F.C. players
Iraklis Thessaloniki F.C. players
OFI Crete F.C. players
Panserraikos F.C. players
Volos N.F.C. players
Football League (Greece) players
Super League Greece players
Challenger Pro League players
Association football defenders
Greek expatriate sportspeople in Italy
Greek expatriate sportspeople in Belgium
Expatriate footballers in Italy
Expatriate footballers in Belgium
Sportspeople from the South Aegean